Dedinky is a village and municipality in the Rožňava District in the Košice Region of eastern Slovakia.

History
In historical records the village was first mentioned in 1386.

Geography
The village lies at an altitude of 795 metres and covers an area of 3.643 km2.
It has a population of about 300 people.

Culture
The village has a small public library and a football pitch.

Genealogical resources

The records for genealogical research are available at the state archive "Statny Archiv in Kosice, Slovakia"

See also
 List of municipalities and towns in Slovakia

References

External links
Dedinky
Official homepage
Touristic page of Dedinky
Dedinky information on www.retep.sk
Surnames of living people in Dedinky

Villages and municipalities in Rožňava District